Les Bonnes Femmes is a 1960 French comedic drama film directed by Claude Chabrol. Its mix of melodrama, absurd comedy and tragedy is typical for the early, experimental New Wave films. Though unsuccessful upon its initial release in France, it was subject to critical reevaluation, and is now regarded as the best of Chabrol's early films. There are a considerable number of scenes set on the streets, and the viewer gets an expansive look at how Paris looked at the time, in night and day.

Plot
The film tells the story of four attractive single Parisian women and their domestic and romantic encounters. Several of them work as saleswomen in an appliance store, one moonlights as an entertainer, and all are pursued by Parisian men both good and bad. Jane is pursued by men and portrayed as being more ditzy and happy go lucky. Ginette works during the night as an entertainer and reveals that she hates her day job with the other girls. Rita has a fiancé, but during dinner with his parents, one sees that he thinks very little of her as an intellectual and a person. Jacqueline is pursued through the film by a mysterious man on a motorcycle, and even turns down other men after developing feelings for him despite never meeting. However, after the two finally meet and proclaim their love for each other, the man murders Jacqueline in the forest and then flees on his motorcycle.

Cast
 Bernadette Lafont — Jane
 Clotilde Joano — Jacqueline
 Stéphane Audran — Ginette
 Lucile Saint-Simon — Rita
 Mario David — André Lapierre (the motorcyclist)
 Pierre Bertin — Belin (the shop owner)
 Ave Ninchi — Louise
 Jean-Louis Maury — Marcel
 Albert Dinan — Albert
 Sacha Briquet — Henri
 Claude Berri — André, Jane's boyfriend

Reception
The film was a commercial failure in France, and wasn't shown in the United States until 1966. Later it was subject to critical reevaluation, and is now regarded as the best of Chabrol's early films. Robert Alden in The New York Times wrote that "Les Bonnes Femmes is not a perfect film, but it is a worthwhile piece of cinema and it deserves more recognition than it has had." The Los Angeles Times reviewer wrote: "Chabrol shoves aside the mechanics of suspense almost entirely to engage us in a sensitive study of character. As a result, "Les Bonnes Femmes" remains one of his most individual—and most satisfying—works." Time Out said: "At once a detailed portrait of Parisian life and an ironic, witty study of human foibles, the film remains emotionally affecting thanks to Chabrol's unsentimental compassion for his subjects." Writing in The Guardian, David Thomson called it "one of Chabrol's best films, in which the four shopgirls he observes are all versions of the Emma Bovary dream. It's a great movie just because the people seem so ordinary and their lives so trivial." Indiewire described it as "a simultaneously heartbreaking and chillingly dark piece," and added that "the cruel world he [Chabrol] depicts... is a man’s world, and women are just passing time in it."

In the works of others
The murder in the woods scene inspired the climactic sequence in Rainer Werner Fassbinder's 13-part miniseries Berlin Alexanderplatz (1980).

References

External links
 
 

1960 films
1960 comedy-drama films
1960 romantic comedy films
1960s comedy mystery films
1960s French-language films
1960s satirical films
French comedy-drama films
French comedy mystery films
French romantic comedy films
French satirical films
Films directed by Claude Chabrol
Films with screenplays by Paul Gégauff
1960s French films